Habib Pacha El-Saad (1867 – 5 May 1942) was a Lebanese Maronite politician who was born in Ain Traz, Aley District. He served as the Speaker of the Parliament of Lebanon from May 1922 to October 1923. Initially the 3rd Prime Minister of Lebanon from August 10, 1928 to May 9, 1929 he was named President under the French Mandate on January 30, 1934 and served in this capacity to January 20, 1936.

Literature 
 Robin Leonard Bidwell: Dictionary of Modern Arab History, p. 361.

See also 
List of presidents of Lebanon

References

Prime Ministers of Lebanon
Presidents of Lebanon
Legislative speakers of Lebanon
Lebanese Maronites
1867 births
1942 deaths
Lebanon under French rule
People from Aley District